George Souris  (born 12 July 1949) is an Australian politician and former member of the New South Wales Legislative Assembly, representing Upper Hunter for the Nationals from 1988 to 2015. Souris is a former leader of the National Party in NSW.

Early years and background
He was born at Gunnedah and was educated at The Armidale School and the University of New England. He has practised as a qualified public accountant, company auditor and taxation consultant. He is married and has two sons.

Political career
Souris has represented Upper Hunter for the National Party of Australia since 1988.  He was Minister for Finance and Minister for Ethnic Affairs from July 1992 to May 1993 and Minister for Land and Water Conservation from May 1993 to the defeat of the Fahey government in March 1995.  He was the leader of the Parliamentary National Party from January 1999 to March 2003.

Souris was deputy leader of the Nationals from 1993 to 1999 when he ousted Ian Armstrong as leader. When he stood down as National Party leader he became the first person to leave the National Party leadership without becoming deputy premier since Sir Davis Hughes (served 1958 to 1959 when the party was then called the Country Party).

Souris was a member of the Shadow Ministry of Barry O'Farrell.

Souris was the Minister for Tourism, Major Events, Hospitality and Racing, and Minister for the Arts in the O'Farrell government, between 2011 and 2014. He was also Minister for the Hunter between December 2013 and April 2014. 
When O'Farrell was succeeded as Premier by Mike Baird, Souris was dumped from Cabinet, a decision that disappointed Souris.
On 27 September he announced that he will retire and not recontest Upper Hunter at the 2015 election. On his retirement announcement he revealed that it was the decision of Deputy Premier and his successor as Nationals leader Andrew Stoner for him to be removed from Cabinet, not Premier Baird's.

References

 

|-

|-

|-

|-

|-

|-

1949 births
Living people
Australian people of Greek descent
Members of the New South Wales Legislative Assembly
National Party of Australia members of the Parliament of New South Wales
Members of the Order of Australia
21st-century Australian politicians